1 Persei (1 Per) is an eclipsing binary star in the constellation Perseus. Its uneclipsed apparent magnitude is 5.49. The binary star consists of two B2 type main-sequence stars in a 25.9 day eccentric orbit. The stars are surrounded by a faint cloud of gas visible in mid-infrared, although whether they are the origin of the gas or simply passing through it is unclear.

Observational history

The possible eclipsing binary nature of 1 Persei was first noticed by Donald Kurtz in 1977 when it was used as a comparison star to test for photometric variability of HD 11408. In 1979 French amateur observers succeeded in determining an orbital period of 25.9 days.  During the primary eclipse, the brightness drops to magnitude 5.85.  In the secondary eclipses, the brightness drops to magnitude 5.74.  The eclipses each last for approximately 25 hours.

References

Perseus (constellation)
B-type main-sequence stars
Algol variables
Persei, 01
Eclipsing binaries
Persei, V436
008704
0533
011241
Durchmusterung objects